Massower See is a lake in the Mecklenburgische Seenplatte district in Mecklenburg-Vorpommern, Germany. At an elevation of 68.9 m, its surface area is 1.133 km².

Lakes of Mecklenburg-Western Pomerania